Nazril Irham (born September 16, 1981), known professionally as Ariel or Ariel "Noah", is an Indonesian musician, singer and songwriter of Minangkabau ancestry. He is the lead singer of Indonesian band Noah, formerly known as Peterpan.

Ariel founded Peterpan in Bandung in 2000 with Andika, Indra, Lukman, Reza, and Uki. Peterpan's second album Bintang di Surga (2004) is one of the best-selling albums of all time in Indonesia. He was arrested in 2010 on charges relating to celebrity sex tapes found circulating on the internet after his laptop was stolen. Peterpan changed their name to Noah after Ariel's release in 2012. Noah also received commercial success, with their first album Seperti Seharusnya (2012) having sold over one million copies.

Music career

2000–2008: Peterpan
Ariel founded Peterpan in Bandung on September 1, 2000, with Andika (keyboard), Indra (bass), Lukman (guitar), Reza (drum), and Uki (guitar). Their recording career started in 2002 when they record their song, "Mimpi Yang Sempurna", for a compilation album by various artists, Kisah 2002 Malam. Afterwards, they were contracted by Musica Studio's and under the name Peterpan released three studio albums: Taman Langit, Bintang di Surga, and Hari Yang Cerah; a compilation album titled Sebuah Nama Sebuah Cerita; and a soundtrack album for the film Alexandria.

After Andika and Indra split from the band in 2006, they demanded their former band to change their name. The remaining band members agreed and stopped using the name after 2008. Ariel, Uki, Lukman, Reza, and their new keyboardist, David, planned to announce their new name in 2010, but the plan was put into a halt after Ariel was arrested.

2009–2012: Ariel, Uki, Lukman, Reza, David
During Ariel's time in prison, his band–credited as Ariel, Uki, Lukman, Reza, David–released an album mostly consisting of instrumental version of Peterpan's songs titled Suara Lainnya in May 2012. His bandmates routinely visited him in prison while working on the album in order to get his input. Ariel's 2011 single "Dara" was included as a bonus track in the album.

2012–present: Noah

After Ariel was released from prison, Ariel, Uki, Lukman, Reza and David announced their new band name: Noah, on August 2, 2012. Noah released their first album under their new name, Seperti Seharusnya, in September 2012. The album was a commercial success, having sold over 1.2 million copies, making it one of the best-selling album in Indonesia. To date, they have released four studio album: Seperti Seharusnya, Second Chance, Sings Legends, and Keterkaitan Keterikatan.

Solo work
During his time in prison, Ariel released a solo single titled "Dara". It was released on April 18, 2011.

In 2014, Ariel, along with fellow Musica Studio's vocalists Giring Nidji and Momo Geisha, collaborated with fellow Musica Studio's band d'Masiv on the band's single "Esok Kan Bahagia". In the next year, Ariel's vocals was featured in Sheryl Sheinafia's single "Kutunggu Kau Putus", which was nominated for Best Pop Collaboration on 19th Anugerah Musik Indonesia.

Ariel sang on two songs from the official album of 2018 Asian Games. The first was "Bright As The Sun", which was sung by 18 Indonesian singers including Ariel. The second one was "Janger Persahabatan", which was written by Guruh Sukarnoputra and performed by NEV+ (a side project of Nidji, focusing on electronic music), Ariel, and Hivi! former vocalist Dea.

Musicianship
Ariel tried his hand at songwriting during middle school. One of the songs Ariel wrote during high school, titled "Yang Terdalam" (the deepest), received praise from his friends. The positive response drove Ariel to write more songs.

Ariel's musical style was influenced by the grunge band Nirvana ever since his teenage days. Ariel is a fan of Nirvana's vocalist Kurt Cobain.

Ariel's songwriting was influenced by the poet Kahlil Gibran. Ariel was introduced to Gibran's writings in high school and liked the meaning he found behind Gibran's poetry.

Celebrity sex tape scandal
The Bill against Pornography and Pornoaction came into effect in Indonesia in 2008. In June 2010 Ariel was charged with breaking the law by appearing in two sex videos found on the Internet. Ariel claimed the tapes were stolen from his house and posted online without his consent, but the judge argued the pop star did nothing to prevent their widespread distribution.

TV presenter Luna Maya and soap opera star Cut Tari denied being the women in the videos. However, on July 9, 2011, Cut Tari admitted to being in one of the three sex videos. The confession was made as Cut Tari did not want to preempt the police's investigation into the case. The sex video prompted an outpouring of criticism from conservative Muslims.

Ariel was held in custody from his arrest until his trial, in Bandung, West Java, which began in November 2010. On 31 January 2011 a guilty verdict resulted in three years in prison. The video could also result in prosecution under a law banning adultery, owing to Cut Tari having been married at the time it was made in 2006. The two women were not charged.

On 31 January 2011, Ariel was sentenced to  years behind bars and fined 250 million rupiah (US$28,000). Prosecutors had asked for a five-year sentence. The maximum sentence possible for the charges was 12 years. On 25 April 2011 the Bandung High Court rejected his appeal.
On 23 July 2012, after serving two years in prison, Ariel was released early for good behaviour.

The scandal became a popular topic. Communications and Information Technology Minister Tifatul Sembiring engaged in a Twitter debate after suggesting that the possibility of mistaken identity was similar to the Muslim belief that a lookalike of Jesus of Nazareth had been crucified; he stated that the internet could "destroy" the nation.

Awards and recognition
Ariel has won numerous awards with Noah, including AMI Awards for Best of the Best Album for Bintang di Surga, Seperti Seharusnya and Keterkaitan Keterikatan; and for Best of the Best Production Work for "Bintang di Surga" and "Separuh Aku". In December 2010, Rolling Stone Indonesia ranked Ariel at number 43 on its list of the Greatest 50 Indonesian Singers. In February 2014, Rolling Stone Indonesia ranked Ariel 28th-best Indonesian songwriter.

Film awards

Music awards

Singles

As featured artist

Filmography

Endorsement
 XL (With Noah)
 Sunsilk
 Lux
 Maxtron
 Yamaha
 KFC
Vaseline men (with Noah)
Kakao Talk (with Noah)
Vitamin Water (With Noah)
BRI (With Noah)
 BRImo
 Greenlight
 Geoff Max
 Gosend
 Kratingdaeng

Notes

References

Living people
1981 births
21st-century Indonesian male singers
Indonesian pop singers
Minangkabau people
People from Langkat Regency
Internet censorship
Privacy controversies and disputes
Sex scandals
Noah (band) members